Skeletons is the fourth and final studio album by the American alternative metal band Nothingface. It is their only album featuring Tommy Sickles on drums. The album was released on April 22, 2003, via TVT Records, their second as well as last album released on the label. The album is considered Nothingface's most diverse release to date, featuring elements of genres such as thrash metal and hardcore.

Background, music and lyrical themes
During the 2001–2002 interval between their previous album Violence and Skeletons, Nothingface experienced significant turmoil with lead singer Matt Holt (who was going through substance abuse issues) seeing his house burn down, Tom Maxwell's mother dying and bassist Bill Gaal divorcing his wife, leading to the band nearly breaking up.

In an interview with Tom Maxwell, he said "I don't think Skeletons has a musical direction. I've said it before but it sounds to me like a band imploding and losing focus. The next record will redeem the sound I believe was lost during the Violence/Skeletons cycle. Too many cooks in the kitchen can sometimes create a mediocre meal. Especially when the cooks come from different schools." The album is considered the band's most diverse release to date, with its music drawing elements from genres such as hardcore and thrash metal. The album's lyrics are also more political than previous Nothingface releases. Lyrical themes on the album include the invasion of Afghanistan, organized religion, murder and the American government. The song "Ether" is about George W. Bush and his Middle East policies. The song "Here Comes the Butchers" is about Catholicism and Catholic Church sexual abuse cases.

Critical reception
The album received positive reviews. Justin Donnelly of Blistering gave the album a positive review and wrote "Skeletons may be both more and extreme in either directions, but with Holt’s upfront lyrical stance, Bill Kennedy’s (Monster Magnet, Nine Inch Nails, Filter) amazing production and a growth in mature evident within the songs, Nothingface will surely mark their mark from year onwards." Ambier Authier of Exclaim.ca gave the album a positive review writing "Highly underrated as a group, Nothingface seems to use Skeletons to take a stab at organised religion and its well-publicised problems, the American government and their actions in the Middle East, and more. Produced by Bill Kennedy (Monster Magnet and Nine Inch Nails), Skeletons will take Nothingface on a long tour schedule including their current run with Ministry and the entire summer on the Ozzfest line-up. The band continues to evolve sonically on their recordings and Skeletons is the current transformation. A good pick." Alex Henderson of Allmusic gave the album a positive review and a 4 out of 5 stars rating, writing "Those who admired Violence can take comfort in knowing that despite the challenges Nothingface's members faced in 2001 and 2002, they have no problem excelling on the equally impressive Skeletons."

Alternative Press compared its heavy yet melodic sound with Alice in Chains.

Track listing

Credits
 Matt Holt – vocals
 Tom Maxwell – guitar
 Bill Gaal – bass, keyboards, programming
 Tommy Sickles – drums

Chart positions

References

2003 albums
Nothingface albums
TVT Records albums
Albums recorded at Armoury Studios